The 1971–72 Plunket Shield season was a tournament of the Plunket Shield, the domestic first-class cricket competition of New Zealand.

Otago won the championship, finishing at the top of the points table at the end of the round-robin tournament between the six first-class sides, Auckland, Canterbury, Central Districts, Northern Districts, Otago and Wellington. Ten points were awarded for a win with one bonus point for every 25 runs over 150 and for every 2 wickets taken (in the first 65 overs only).

Table
Below are the Plunket Shield standings for the season:

References

Plunket Shield
Plunket Shield